Chung Hwang-keun (born 20 January 1960) is a South Korean government official who currently serves as Minister of Agriculture, Food and Rural Affairs in the Cabinet of Yoon Suk-yeol.

References 

1960 births
Living people
People from Cheonan
Seoul National University alumni
Ministers of Agriculture of South Korea
21st-century South Korean politicians